Hermann Historic District is a national historic district located at Hermann, Gasconade County, Missouri. The district encompasses 360 contributing buildings, 4 contributing structures, and 3 contributing objects in the central business district and surrounding residential sections of Hermann. The district developed between about 1838 and 1910, and includes representative examples of Greek Revival and Classical Revival style architecture.  Notable buildings include the Eitzen
House (1855), Potnmer-Gentner House (1848), Hermann City Hall (1906), Strehly House (1845), Concert Hall (1877), The German School (1871), and Gasconade County Courthouse (1896).

It was listed on the National Register of Historic Places in 1972, with a boundary increase in 2006.

References

Historic districts on the National Register of Historic Places in Missouri
Greek Revival architecture in Missouri
Neoclassical architecture in Missouri
Buildings and structures in Gasconade County, Missouri
National Register of Historic Places in Gasconade County, Missouri